George Andguladze (born August 6, 1984) is a Georgian operatic bass.

Born in Tbilisi, Georgian SSR, he graduated from the Accademia delle voci Verdiane and began his operatic career in  Italy at Festival Verdi singing Ferrando from Il Trovatore.

Education
In 2000/2001 he won a scholarship offered by the President of the State of Georgia, Eduard Shevardnadze. In 1999 he finished his studies of piano at Zurab Andjaparidze music school. In 2002, he completed his studies at Meliton Balanchivadze in Tbilisi, where he graduated in Choral and Orchestral Conducting. In 2003 he graduated at the Accademia delle voci Verdiane in Busseto, where he also participated in some events organized by Fondazione Arturo Toscanini. Later he attended a master classes program with Renato Bruson and he graduated in lyrical singing at the Conservatory of Reggio nell’Emilia under the guidance of Mauro Trombetta.

Career

In 2009 he debuted at the Teatro Comunale in Ferrara with an opera buffa by Franz Joseph Haydn, “Il mondo della luna”, playing the role of Buonafede. In 2011 he debuted in Parma with “The Servant Mistress” (La serva padrona), that was later performed on the stages of Emilia Romagna. In July 2011 he participated in the Bellagio Festival, Lake Como, once again with “The Servant Mistress”. In October of the same year he participated in “Il Trovatore”,  as “Ferrando” performed as a concert directed by Michelle Mariotti at the Teatro Verdi in Busseto and Teatro Magniani in Fidenza, inside the season of the Festival Verdi.

Some of his subsequent interpretations:
Ramfis, Aida - Teatro Regio di Parma, conductor Antonio Fogliani 2012
Jorg, Stiffelio - Teatro Regio di Parma, conductor Andrea Battistoni 2012
Monterone, Rigoletto - Teatro Regio di Parma, Festival Verdi, conductor Daniel Oren 2012
Basso, Requiem Verdi - Fondazione Pergolesi Spontini di Jesi 2013
Escamillo, Carmen - Luglio Musicale Trapanese, director Ivo Lipanovich 2014
Haushofmeister, Capriccio (extract) - Auditorium Rainer III, Montecarlo, conductor Jeffrey Tate 2015
Escamillo, Carmen - Galina Vishnevskaya Opera Center, Moscow, conductor Walter Attanasi 2015
Il Re, Aida - Teatro Sociale di Rovigo, conductor Marco Boemi 2015
Escamillo, Carmen - Sejong Center for the Performing Arts, Korea, conductor Gaetano Soliman 2015
Il Re, Aida - Teatro Verdi di Pisa, conductor Marco Boemi 2016
Bass, Stabat Mater (Rossini) - Basilica Santa Maria in Aracoeli, Rome, conductor Gianluigi Gelmetti 2016
Massimiliano, I Masnadieri (Verdi) - Teatro Verdi di Busseto, Festival Verdi, conductor Simon Krecic 2016
Filippo II, Don Carlo (Verdi) - Opera Romana Craiova 2016
Commendatore, Don Giovanni (Mozart) - Kongresove Centrum, Zlin 2016
Fiesco, Simon Boccanegra (Verdi) - Opera Romana Craiova 2016
Ramfis, Aida (Verdi) - Opera Kazan, Festival Shalyapin 2017
Ramfis, Aida (Verdi) - Tbilisi Opera and Ballet State Theatre, conductor Daniel Oren 2017
Bass, Messa di Requiem (Donizetti) - Basilica Santa Maria in Aracoeli, Rome, conductor Gianluigi Gelmetti 2017
Massimiliano, I Masnadieri (Verdi) - Teatro Verdi di Busseto, conductor Simon Krecic 2017
Timur, Turandot (Puccini) - 63° Festival Pucciniano, Torre del Lago, conductor Alberto Veronesi 2017
Il Re, Aida (Verdi) - Arena di Verona, conductor Andrea Battistoni 2017
Il Re, Aida (Verdi) - Teatro Petruzzelli di Bari, conductor Giampaolo Bisanti 2017
Oroveso, Norma (Bellini) - Teatro Giuseppe Verdi di Salerno, conductor Daniel Oren 2017
Zaccaria, Nabucco (Verdi) - Teatro Goldoni di Livorno, conductor Marco Severi 2017
Sparafucile, Rigoletto (Verdi) - Teatro Regio di Parma, conductor Francesco Ivan Ciampa 2018

Repertory
 Debuted roles

DVD

References

External links 

Album list at Naxos Records
Repertoire and Schedule on Operabase
George Andguladze on Operacritic.com

21st-century male opera singers from Georgia (country)
Operatic basses
Musicians from Tbilisi
Living people
1984 births